The 2020 Middle Tennessee Blue Raiders football team represented Middle Tennessee State University as a member of the East Division of Conference USA (C-USA) during the 2020 NCAA Division I FBS football season. Led by 15th-year head coach Rick Stockstill, the Blue Raiders compiled an overall record of 3–6 with a mark of 2–4 in conference play, placing fifth in the C-USA's East Division. The team played home games at Johnny "Red" Floyd Stadium in Murfreesboro, Tennessee.

Previous season
The Blue Raiders finished the 2019 regular season 4–8, 3–5 in CUSA play to finish in fifth in the East Division. They were not invited to play in any post season bowl game.

Preseason

Award watch lists 
Listed in the order that they were released

CUSA media days
The CUSA Media Days was held virtually for the first time in conference history.

Preseason All-CUSA teams
To be released

Schedule
Middle Tennessee announced its 2020 football schedule on January 8, 2020. The original 2020 schedule consists of six home and six away games in the regular season. The Blue Raiders had games scheduled against Duke, Indiana State, Old Dominion, UConn, Virginia Tech, and UAB which were canceled due to the COVID-19 pandemic.

Game summaries

at Army

Troy

at UTSA

Western Kentucky

at FIU

North Texas

at Rice

at Marshall

at Troy

References

Middle Tennessee
Middle Tennessee Blue Raiders football seasons
Middle Tennessee Blue Raiders football